The Peripheral is an American science fiction drama television series created by Scott B. Smith. Produced by Amazon, it is loosely based on the 2014 book of the same name, written by William Gibson. Westworld creators Jonathan Nolan and Lisa Joy serve as executive producers, along with Athena Wickham, Steve Hoban, and Vincenzo Natali. Set roughly a decade in the future, with new technology that has changed society in subtle ways, a VR gamer is delivered a connection to an alternate reality as well as a dark future of her own.

The series had its world premiere on October 11, 2022, at the Ace Hotel in Los Angeles, before its debut on October 21, 2022, on Amazon Prime Video.  In February 2023, the series was renewed for a second season.

Cast

Main
 Chloë Grace Moretz as Flynne Fisher
 Gary Carr as Wilf Netherton
 Jack Reynor as Burton Fisher
 JJ Feild as Lev Zubov
 T'Nia Miller as Cherise Nuland
 Louis Herthum as Corbell Pickett
 Katie Leung as Ash
 Melinda Page Hamilton as Ella Fisher
 Chris Coy as Jasper Baker
 Alex Hernandez as Tommy Constantine
 Julian Moore-Cook as Ossian
 Adelind Horan as Billy Ann Baker
 Austin Rising as Leon
 Eli Goree as Conner Penske
 Charlotte Riley as Aelita West
 Alexandra Billings as Inspector Ainsley Lowbeer

Recurring
 David Hoflin as Daniel
 Hannah Arterton as Dee Dee
 India Mullen as Mary Pickett
 Miles Barrow as Mason
 Gavin Dunn as Edward
 Moe Bar-El as Reece
 Chuku Modu as Carlos
 Harrison Gilbertson as Atticus
 Duke Davis Roberts as Cash
 Claire Cooper as Dominika Zubov
 Poppy Corby-Tuech as Mariel Raphael
 Amber Rose Revah as Grace Hogart
 Ned Dennehy as Bob
 Ben Dickey as Sheriff Jackman
 Anjli Mohindra as Beatrice

Production

Development
In April 2018, a TV series adaptation of William Gibson's novel The Peripheral was announced by Westworld creators Lisa Joy and Jonathan Nolan for Amazon with a script-to-series commitment. It was announced in April 2019 that Joy and Nolan had signed a first look overall deal at Amazon Studios, and the project received a series order in the middle of November 2019, with Joy and Nolan executive producing under their overall deal. Beyond Joy and Nolan, executive producers include Athena Wickham, Steve Hoban, and Vincenzo Natali. The show has hour-long episodes, developed by Kilter Films, through Amazon Studios. Warner Bros. Television is also co-financier and producer, with Scott Smith as writer. Smith created the series, while also serving as showrunner and executive producer. Natali directed the show's pilot. On March 30, 2021, Greg Plageman joined the series as executive producer and replaced Smith as showrunner. In February 2023, Amazon Prime Video renewed the series for a second season.

Casting
In October 2020, it was announced that Chloë Grace Moretz was cast in the lead role of Flynne Fisher, with Gary Carr also joining the main cast. In March 2021, Jack Reynor joined the series in a main role. The following month, Eli Goree, Charlotte Riley, JJ Feild, Adelind Horan, T'Nia Miller, and Alex Hernandez were added to the main cast. In June 2021, Louis Herthum, Chris Coy, Melinda Page Hamilton, Katie Leung, and Austin Rising joined the cast in recurring roles. In July 2021, Alexandra Billings joined the cast in a recurring role.

Filming
Principal photography for the series began on May 3, 2021, in London, England. Filming moved to Marshall, North Carolina on September 24. Production on the series wrapped on November 5, 2021.

Episodes

Release
The Peripheral had its world premiere on October 11, 2022, at the Ace Hotel in Los Angeles, before its debut on October 21, 2022, on Amazon Prime Video. As with other Amazon shows, the episodes aired at midnight Eastern, so technically the release dates were the day before for the Pacific audience. The first season had 8 episodes and ended with a cliffhanger, with Lisa Joy stating, "I would love to have season 2 and season 3 and all the seasons in the world to explore this amazing, amazing novel."

Reception
The review aggregator website Rotten Tomatoes reported a 77% approval rating with an average rating of 6.7/10, based on 53 critic reviews. The website's critics consensus reads, "Somewhere on the edges of this sci-fi vision is a compelling narrative, but The Peripheral single-minded focus on its lofty ideas comes at the expense of character or coherence." Metacritic, which uses a weighted average, assigned a score of 57 out of 100 based on 20 critics, indicating "mixed or average reviews".

References

External links
 The Peripheral at Amazon Prime Video
 

2020s American drama television series
2020s American science fiction television series
2022 American television series debuts
Amazon Prime Video original programming
American thriller television series
English-language television shows
Television series based on American novels
Television series by Amazon Studios
Television series by Warner Bros. Television Studios
Television shows filmed in North Carolina
Television shows shot in London
William Gibson
Works by Jonathan Nolan
Works by Scott Smith